This is a list of films released by the American film production and distribution company Orion Pictures.

Films that won the Oscar for Best Picture are noted with one asterisk (*). Films that were nominated for Best Picture but did not win are noted with two asterisks (**).

1970s

1980s

1990s

2010s

2020s

Upcoming films

Notes

References

Orion Pictures

O